Open is the second studio album from the Christian band yFriday.  Released in 2001 the CD also contains Head Over Heels which was released as the band's only single.

Track listing
 Creator (4:18)
 At the Cross (3:51)
 Glory (4:10)
 Head Over Heels (3:44)
 I Love You (3:12)
 Rain (5:01)
 Praise (4:22)
 Carry Me (4:38)
 Joy (3:44)
 Shelter (5:12)

Head Over Heels
Head over Heels was released as a single on the Survivor Record label.  In contained two tracks, Head over Heels and a remix of the track Closer, taken from their first album Rainmaker.  Also on the CD was a music video for Head over Heels.

Personnel
 Ken Riley - Vocals & Guitars
 Gav Richards - Keyboards, Guitars & Backing Vocals
 Danny Smith - Bass & Backing Vocals
 Dez Minto - Drums

2001 albums
Survivor Records albums
YFriday albums